Spain Musgrove (July 30, 1945 – August 20, 2021) was an American football defensive tackle in the National Football League for the Washington Redskins and the Houston Oilers from 1967–1970.

Early career
Musgrove played high school football at Bakersfield High School in Bakersfield, California.  He then attended Bakersfield College, a junior college, before playing college football at Utah State University (USU). Musgrove wore #76 while at USU, and went 4-6 during his senior year (1966).

Professional career
Standing at 6'4" and weighing 275 lbs., Musgrove was drafted in the second round (38th overall) of the 1967 NFL Draft by the Redskins.  He was one of five Utah State Aggies football players selected in 1967.  Musgrove would play for the Redskins from 1967 to 1969.  He was then claimed off waivers in 1970 by the Oilers, where he would play his final season.

References

External links
NFL profile
DatabaseFootball.com profile
ProFootballReference profile
JT-SW profile

1945 births
2021 deaths
Players of American football from Kansas City, Missouri
American football defensive linemen
Utah State Aggies football players
Washington Redskins players
Houston Oilers players